Erich Böhlke (9 September 1895 – 19 April 1979) was a German conductor and composer.

Life 
Böhlke was born as the son of an art dealer in Szczecin. Already as a child and teenager he made his mark musically. So from 1909, he directed the Stettin male choral society Melodia. During the First World War he served on the Eastern Front. He passed the 2nd teacher's exam, but then he devoted himself entirely to music.

From 1919 he studied at the Berlin University of the Arts. Further stations were from 1926 musical director at the Theater Koblenz and from 1929 chief conductor at the Staatstheater Wiesbaden. In 1934, he became general music director and artistic director of the Stadttheater Magdeburg. There he was replaced as artistic director by a party member in 1939, but remained general music director until the war-related closure in 1944.

After the Second World War he was General Music Director of the Staatstheater Oldenburg from 1947 to 1950. From 1950 he worked as a freelance musician. During this time he was, among other things, guest conductor at the Tōkyō Geijutsu Daigaku, where he was awarded the title of honorary professor in 1963.

Böhlke was also active as a composer and composed over 100 songs, among other things. (in German)

Literature 
 Gerd Lüpke: Erich Böhlke. Porträt eines pommerschen Musikers. In Pommern. Issue 3/1970, . Neu abgedruckt in Die Pommersche Zeitung. Nr. 25/2013, .
 Eckhard Wendt: Stettiner Lebensbilder (Veröffentlichungen der . Series V, vol. 40). Böhlau, Cologne/Weimar/Vienna 2004, .
 Festschrift für Erich Böhlke zum 75. Geburtstag 9. September 1970.
 Werkverzeichnis Erich Böhlke.
 Das heute geltende Pachtrecht.
 Gedarken um Schostakasitsch und seine Zehrte.

References

External links 
 Biography in Magdeburger Biographischen Lexikon
 
 

1895 births
1979 deaths
Musicians from Szczecin
German conductors (music)
20th-century classical composers
20th-century German composers
Officers Crosses of the Order of Merit of the Federal Republic of Germany